Bolandia is a genus of flowering plants belonging to the family Asteraceae.

Its native range is South African Republic.

Species:

Bolandia argillacea 
Bolandia elongata 
Bolandia glabrifolia 
Bolandia pedunculosa 
Bolandia pinnatifida

References

Senecioneae
Asteraceae genera